White Trinidadians and Tobagonians (sometimes Euro-Trinidadians and Tobagonians or local-whites) are Trinidadians of European descent. However, while the term White Trinidadian is used to refer collectively to all Caucasians who are Trinidadian, whether by birth or naturalization, the term local-white is used to refer more specifically to Trinidad-born Caucasians and in particular, those who trace their roots back to Trinidad's early settlers.

White Trinidadians and Tobagonians account for less than 1% of the population of Trinidad and Tobago. However, the classification is primarily a superficial description based on phenotypic description opposed to genotypical classification.

Most white Trinidadians and Tobagonians are of Portuguese stock. Trinidad and Tobago was colonized by the Spanish, the French and the British.

History
The first Europeans to discover and settle in Trinidad and Tobago were the Spanish. Trinidad was originally a Spanish colony and was under Spanish rule. Until the british took hold of Trinidad in 1797.  The French and the English later colonized the islands. The French arrived during Spanish colonization. Portuguese people were brough to replace freed African slaves. Europeans makeup 0.6% of Trinidad and Tobago’s population. Many live in the suburbs of Port of Spain. Many Europeans in Trinidad and Tobago are of British, French, Italian, Spanish, Portuguese and German heritage.

Origins
Many white Trinidadians originate from the colonial era, in which English, Scottish, Welsh, Irish, French, Portuguese, Dutch, German, and Corsican people filled the gap required to work as overseers on estates, farming sugarcane, cocoa and to fill the gap required for labor on agricultural estates at the time.

Notable European Trinidadians and Tobagonians

Allan Alvarez (also known as Cheese), speedrunner
Stephen Ames, golfer
Ralph de Boissière, novelist
George Bovell, swimmer
Chris Birchall, footballer
Mercedes Carvajal de Arocha, first female elected to the Senate of Venezuela
Arthur Andrew Cipriani, politician
Danny Cipriani, rugby player
Albert Gomes, unionist, politician and writer 
Justin Guillen, cricketer
Stephen Hart, footballer and manager of Trinidad and Tobago national team
Francesca Hawkins, filmmaker, news anchor
David Jenkins, sprinter
Andrew Lewis, sailor
Alfred Mendes, writer 
Sam Mendes, director
Peter Minshall, artistry
Sean De Silva, footballer
Jeff Stollmeyer, cricketer, senator, journalist, businessman
Lowell Yerex, founder of BWIA
Joshua Da Silva, West Indian and Trinidadian cricketer

References

Ethnic groups in Trinidad and Tobago
Trinidad and Tobago people of European descent
White Caribbean